Love Remains is the debut studio album by How to Dress Well.  Pitchfork placed it at number 19 on its list of "The Top 50 Albums of 2010".

Track listing

References 

2010 debut albums
How to Dress Well albums
Tri Angle (record label) albums